Qiancheng Town is a town and the county seat in the middle western Hongjiang City, Hunan, China. The town was reformed through the amalgamation of townships of Hongyan and Tuxi, towns of Shuangxi and the former Qiancheng, and Ganxiping Village of the former  Yanlong Township on November 25, 2015.

See also 
 List of township-level divisions of Hunan

References

Hongjiang
Towns of Huaihua
County seats in Hunan